The Quchan University of Technology is a state university located in Quchan, Iran.
Established in 2006, it was formerly named Technical Institute of Engineering.

History
The Quchan University of Technology was founded at first as a technical college in 2007. It began its activities in January 2007 with 70 students of Computer Engineering and Telecommunications. It converted to Higher Education Complexes of Engineering of Quchan in 2009. In 2013 the Quchan University of Technology was confirmed by the Ministry of Science, Research, and Technology of Iran.The Quchan University of Technology has more than 3000 students with 65 scientific boards.

Colleges
There are seven colleges of the Quchan University.

 Faculty Of Engineering
 Department of Chemical and Energy Engineering
 Department of Civil Engineering
 Department of Mathematics
 Department of Mechanical and Industrial Engineering
 Faculty Of Electrical and Computer Engineering

 Faculty Of Electrical and Computer Engineering
 Department of Computer Engineering
 Department of Electrical Engineering

Picture Gallery

External links

Quchan University of Technology

References

Universities in Iran
Quchan_University_of_Techonology
Education in Razavi Khorasan Province
Buildings and structures in Razavi Khorasan Province